Natalia Valerievna Fileva (27 November 1963 – 31 March 2019) was a Russian businesswoman and chairman of the board of directors of S7 Airlines.

Biography 
Born in Novosibirsk, Fileva graduated from the Novosibirsk State Technical University with a degree in radio engineering and the Novosibirsk State University of Economics and Management with a degree in production management.

Fileva was married to Vladislav Filev, general director of S7 Airlines. They had three children. On 31 March 2019, she was a passenger on an Epic LT, when it crashed in a field on approach to Frankfurt Egelsbach Airport, killing all the three people aboard, including her father. Fileva was en route to a medical appointment in Frankfurt from France when the crash occurred. Also, two other people died when a police vehicle travelling to the scene of the crash collided with another car near the airport. The three police officers in the police car suffered serious injuries.

References

External links
 «Она построила лучший авиационный бизнес в стране»: жизнь и принципы Наталии Филевой. Forbes Russia. 1 April 2019.

1963 births
2019 deaths
Chief executives in the airline industry
Businesspeople from Novosibirsk
Victims of aviation accidents or incidents in Germany
Victims of aviation accidents or incidents in 2019
Novosibirsk State Technical University alumni
Novosibirsk State University of Economics and Management alumni